Levi Greenwood (born 19 February 1989) is a retired Australian rules footballer, who played for North Melbourne from 2009 to 2014 and for Collingwood from 2015 to 2021 in the Australian Football League (AFL).

Greenwood grew up in the small coastal town of Port Neill on the Eyre Peninsula, and moved to Whyalla in his teens.

Greenwood played his junior football at the North Whyalla Football Club in South Australia. He joined the Port Adelaide Magpies in 2005, where he played under-17s and under-19s football. In 2007, he played eleven games in the Port Adelaide seniors in the SANFL at the age of just eighteen. He nominated for the 2007 AFL National Draft, where he was selected by North Melbourne with its second round draft selection (#32 overall). Greenwood is mainly used in the midfield.

Levi played his first game in Round 5 2009 against Richmond.

Finished equal second in the best and fairest 2014 before requesting a trade to the Collingwood Magpies. The deal was finalised on the second last day of trade week with Collingwood sending pick 25 in return for Greenwood.

In June 2021, Greenwood announced his retirement from football following complications resulting from concussions sustained during his career.

Statistics
Statistics are correct to the end of the 2021 season

|-
|- style="background-color: #eaeaea"
! scope="row" style="text-align:center" | 2008
|style="text-align:center;"|
| 24 || 0 || — || — || — || — || — || — || — || — || — || — || — || — || — || —
|- 
! scope="row" style="text-align:center" | 2009
|style="text-align:center;"|
| 24 || 11 || 1 || 2 || 75 || 46 || 121 || 21 || 48 || 0.1 || 0.2 || 6.8 || 4.2 || 11.0 || 1.9 || 4.4
|- style="background-color: #eaeaea"
! scope="row" style="text-align:center" | 2010
|style="text-align:center;"|
| 24 || 17 || 4 || 5 || 156 || 151 || 307 || 64 || 79 || 0.2 || 0.3 || 9.2 || 8.9 || 18.1 || 3.8 || 4.6
|-
! scope="row" style="text-align:center" | 2011
|style="text-align:center;"|
| 24 || 13 || 3 || 2 || 97 || 105 || 202 || 19 || 49 || 0.2 || 0.2 || 7.5 || 8.1 || 15.5 || 1.5 || 3.8
|- style="background-color: #eaeaea"
! scope="row" style="text-align:center" | 2012
|style="text-align:center;"|
| 24 || 5 || 1 || 3 || 39 || 26 || 65 || 4 || 19 || 0.2 || 0.6 || 7.8 || 5.2 || 13.0 || 0.8 || 3.8
|- 
! scope="row" style="text-align:center" | 2013
|style="text-align:center;"|
| 24 || 6 || 1 || 0 || 60 || 71 || 131 || 16 || 33 || 0.2 || 0.0 || 10.0 || 11.8 || 21.8 || 2.7 || 5.5
|- style="background-color: #eaeaea"
! scope="row" style="text-align:center" | 2014
|style="text-align:center;"|
| 24 || 22 || 16 || 18 || 322 || 228 || 550 || 119 || 97 || 0.7 || 0.8 || 14.6 || 10.4 || 25.0 || 5.4 || 4.4
|- 
! scope="row" style="text-align:center" | 2015
|style="text-align:center;"|
| 19 || 8 || 4 || 1 || 81 || 63 || 144 || 32 || 48 || 0.5 || 0.1 || 10.1 || 7.9 || 18.0 || 4.0 || 6.0
|- style="background-color: #eaeaea"
! scope="row" style="text-align:center" | 2016
|style="text-align:center;"|
| 19 || 21 || 18 || 9 || 204 || 161 || 365 || 49 || 135 || 0.9 || 0.4 || 9.7 || 7.7 || 17.4 || 2.3 || 6.4
|- 
! scope="row" style="text-align:center" | 2017
|style="text-align:center;"|
| 19 || 16 || 7 || 18 || 143 || 107 || 250 || 73 || 51 || 0.4 || 1.1 || 8.9 || 6.7 || 15.6 || 4.6 || 3.2
|- style="background-color: #eaeaea"
! scope="row" style="text-align:center" | 2018
|style="text-align:center;"|
| 19 || 16 || 1 || 5 || 145 || 70 || 215 || 47 || 55 || 0.06 || 0.3 || 9.1 || 4.4 || 13.4 || 2.9 || 3.4
|- 
! scope="row" style="text-align:center" | 2019
|style="text-align:center;"|
| 19 || 17 || 0 || 1 || 160 || 91 || 251 || 77 || 43 || 0.0 || 0.06 || 9.4 || 5.4 || 14.8 || 4.5 || 2.5
|- style="background-color: #eaeaea"
! scope="row" style="text-align:center" | 2020
|style="text-align:center;"|
| 19 || 6 || 1 || 0 || 37 || 33 || 70 || 8 || 19 || 0.2 || 0.0 || 6.2 || 5.5 || 11.7 || 1.3 || 3.2
|- 
! scope="row" style="text-align:center" | 2021
|style="text-align:center;"|
| 19 || 2 || 0 || 0 || 16 || 9 || 25 || 3 || 7 || 0.0 || 0.0 || 8.0 || 4.5 || 12.5 || 1.5 || 3.5
|- class="sortbottom"
! colspan=3| Career
! 160
! 57
! 64
! 1535
! 1161
! 2696
! 532
! 683
! 0.4
! 0.4
! 9.6
! 7.3
! 16.9
! 3.3
! 4.3
|}

References

External links

Australian rules footballers from South Australia
North Melbourne Football Club players
Collingwood Football Club players
Port Adelaide Magpies players
Living people
1989 births